The Kyrgyzstan national badminton team represents Kyrgyzstan in international badminton team competitions. The Kyrgyz national team is controlled by the Kyrgyzstan Badminton and Squash Federation (Kyrgyz: Кыргызстандын бадминтон жана сквош федерациясы, Keurgeuzstandeun Badminton Zhana Skvosh Federaciyaseu) located in Bishkek. The team used to compete under the Soviet Union in European tournaments before the USSR was dissolved.

While badminton is not popular in Kyrgyzstan, the national junior team have competed in the Central Asia Regional Badminton Team Championships in 2022 with other Central Asian nations.

Participation in Badminton Asia Regional competitions

Central Asia 
Kyrgyzstan made its team debut in the 2022 Central Asia Regional Badminton Team Championships. The U17 mixed team finished in 4th place.

Mixed team U17

Current squad 
The following players were selected to represent Kyrgyzstan at the 2022 Central Asia Regional Badminton Team Championships.

Male players
Adilet Kubatbek Uulu
Bayel Madiraimov

Female players
Zhasmin Aisarova
Elayim Azamat

References 

Badminton
National badminton teams